Charles Deas (December 22, 1818 – March 23, 1867) was an American painter noted for his oil paintings of Native Americans and fur trappers of the mid-19th century.

Biography

Charles Deas was born in Philadelphia, Pennsylvania. He attempted, and failed, to obtain an appointment to the United States Military Academy at West Point, New York. As a young man, he studied under John Sanderson in Philadelphia, and subsequently embarked upon a career as a painter. The National Academy of Design in New York soon recognized his work, electing him as an associate member in 1839.

By 1840, he had decided to emulate one of his influences, George Catlin, and travel westward in the United States. It was during travels through the Wisconsin Territory that he became a noted painter of trappers and American Indians. By 1841, Deas decided to establish his base in St. Louis, Missouri. During this time, Deas would typically spend "a few months among the Indian tribes, familiarizing himself with their manners and customs."

The artist's works are described as expressing "psychological tension, perceived danger, alarm, and flight," epitomized by his painting Death Struggle which depicts an Indian and trapper locked in combat while falling to their deaths from a cliff.

Deas was most famous while he was still alive. One critic, in 1947, stated that the painter was considered to have "enjoyed more of a reputation during his own lifetime" than currently. Between 1841 and 1848, Deas' regularly exhibited his works in St. Louis at the "Mechanics Fairs." He also shipped many of his works, for sale, to the Pennsylvania Academy of Fine Arts as well as to New York's American Art Union. Deas returned to New York in 1848 and expressed a desire to open a gallery of Indian art. Before he could do this he was declared legally insane.

On May 23, 1848, Deas was committed to New York's Bloomingdale Asylum (now occupied by Columbia University). He was institutionalized for the rest of his life. During this period, his paintings were described as being particularly intense. "One of his wild pictures, representing a black sea, over which a figure hung, suspended from a ring, while from the waves a monster was springing, was so horrible, that a sensitive artist fainted at the sight." Deas died of "apoplexy" (possible stroke) in Bloomingdale Asylum on March 23, 1867.

Deas' maternal grandfather was the 18th century American politician Ralph Izard of South Carolina.

Selected works

Robert Watts, Jr. (1838), oil on canvas, St. Louis Mercantile Library
Walking the Chalk (1838), oil on canvas, Houston Museum of Fine Arts
Turkey Shooting (1838), oil on canvas, Virginia Museum of Fine Arts
Self Portrait (1840), graphite on buff wove paper, National Academy
Wa-kon-cha-hi-re-ga (1840), oil on canvas, St. Louis Mercantile Library
Winnebago with Peace Medal and Red Pipestone (1840), oil on canvas, St. Louis Mercantile Library
Winnebago with Bear-Claw Necklace (1840), oil on canvas, St. Louis Mercantile Library
Winnebago with Bear-Claw Necklace and Gun-Stock Club (1840), oil on canvas, St. Louis Mercantile Library
 Winnebagos Playing Checkers (1842), private collection
Devil and Tom Walker, (1843), oil on canvas, private collection
Long Jakes (1844), oil on canvas, Denver Art Museum
Dragoons Crossing River (1844), private collection
The Death Struggle (1845), oil on canvas, Shelburne Museum
A Group of Sioux, (1845), oil on canvas, Amon Carter Museum
The Trapper and His Family, (1845), Boston Museum of Fine Arts
The Voyageurs, (1846), oil on canvas, Boston Museum of Fine Arts
Prairie Fire, (1847), oil on canvas, Brooklyn Museum
Indian Warrior on the Edge of a Precipice (1847)

Bibliography

 Clark, Carol et al. Charles Deas and 1840s America, Norman : University of Oklahoma Press, 2009. (OCLC )
 Tuckerman, Henry T., "Deas" IN Artist-life: or, Sketches of American painters, New York: D. Appleton & Company, 1847. pp. 202–214. (OCLC )

References

External links
 Artcyclopedia entry on Charles Deas
 Self portrait of Charles Deas held at the National Academy Museum
 "Artist’s Work, Out of Attics, Goes to Walls of a Museum" Kirk Johnson, The New York Times'', August 24, 2010
 SIRIS (Smithsonian) listing of Deas paintings

1818 births
1867 deaths
19th-century American painters
American male painters
Artists from Philadelphia
Artists of the American West
Schuyler family
Van Cortlandt family